Paul Bernard Holdengräber (born March 15, 1960) is an American interviewer, curator and writer. He was director of the New York Public Library's public programming and organized literary conversations for the NYPL's public program series, LIVE from the NYPL, which he founded.

Since February 2012, he has hosted The Paul Holdengräber Show on the Intelligent Channel on YouTube. In 2019, he was the founding executive director of The Onassis Foundation, a center of dialogue in Los Angeles.

Early life 
Holdengräber was born in Houston, Texas, to father Kurt Holdengräber, and Erica Holdengräber (née Hass). His parents were Austrian Jews with roots in Romania and Poland who fled Austria to Haiti during World War II. Holdengräber's father was originally a second year medical student who was expelled for being Jewish. Among a very small Jewish community of 107 families, Holdengräber's father grew vegetables and worked as a farmer in Haiti, where he met and married Holdengräber's mother. The family moved from Haiti to Mexico City, where his older sister was born. The family then moved from Mexico to Houston, and eventually settled in Brussels, Belgium. Holdengräber spent much of his youth hitchhiking around Europe.

Holdengräber studied philosophy at the Sorbonne. He received a bachelor's degree from the Université Catholique de Louvain in Belgium. In 1995, Holdengräber received a Ph.D. in comparative literature from Princeton University. From 1995 to 1996, he did a post-doctoral fellowship at the Getty Research Institute.

Career

Los Angeles County Museum of Art
Holdengräber was the founder and director of the Institute for Arts and Culture at the Los Angeles County Museum of Art with the idea "to challenge the perception that museums are nothing more than mausoleums for Old Masters". Under Holdengräber's direction, the institute became an active and lively forum for debate with its ambitious lecture series in which painters, poets, performers, writers and thinkers address critical cultural issues through lively talks, discussions and performances.

New York Public Library
In 2004, the then NYPL President Paul LeClerc hired Holdengräber to create a public program at the New York Public Library. Holdengräber founded LIVE from the NYPL, a conversation series with writers, musicians, filmmakers and artists. As the director of LIVE from the NYPL, Holdengräber interviewed hundreds of public personalities, including Patti Smith, Zadie Smith, Anish Kapoor, and Jay Z.

He sees the New York Public Library as a storehouse of knowledge. One of his memorable series of conversations was with the German filmmaker, Werner Herzog.

He has worked in partnership with such organizations as Rolex, The Moth, and PEN World Voices.

The Paul Holdengräber Show
On February 3, 2012, Holdengräber premiered an internet-television talk show called The Paul Holdengräber Show on YouTube's Intelligent Channel. The show has featured interviews with Colum McCann, Elizabeth Gilbert and David Chang.

Teaching
He has taught at Princeton University, Williams College, the University of Miami, and Claremont Graduate University.

Personal life 
Holdengräber lives in the Los Angeles, California, suburb of Glendale with his wife, Barbara Holdengräber, a writer, and their two sons. He speaks four languages: English, French, German, and Spanish. In Brussels, he spoke French as well as Flemish.

Honors 
 2003: French Government, Chevalier des Arts et des Lettres
 Los Angeles Institute for the Humanities at University of Southern California, Fellow
 1995-1996: Getty Research Institute, Fellow
 2010: Austrian President, Austrian Cross of Honor for Science and Art
 New York Institute for the Humanities, Fellow

Board memberships 
 2000-2004: Santa Monica Museum of Art
 Sun Valley Writers Conference
 Paul and Daisy Soros Fellowships for New Americans, Trustee
 New York Center for Ballet and the Arts

Selected works and publications 
Fluent in four languages, Holdengräber has also written essays and articles for journals in France, Germany, and Spain.

References

Further reading

External links 
 
 
 
 Live from the NYPL
 The Paul Holdengräber Show at The Intelligent Channel
 A Phone Call from Paul podcast

1960 births
20th-century American educators
20th-century American non-fiction writers
21st-century American writers
American male bloggers
American bloggers
American curators
American magazine writers
American expatriates in Belgium
American people of Austrian-Jewish descent
American people of Romanian-Jewish descent
American people of Polish-Jewish descent
American Ashkenazi Jews
Chevaliers of the Ordre des Arts et des Lettres
Claremont Graduate University faculty
HuffPost writers and columnists
Jewish American writers
Living people
New York Public Library people
Writers from Brooklyn
People from Houston
Writers from Brussels
Princeton University alumni
Princeton University faculty
Recipients of the Austrian Cross of Honour for Science and Art
University of Miami faculty
Williams College faculty
Writers from Los Angeles
Writers from Texas
21st-century American educators